The San Francisco Bay Area Film Critics Circle Award for Best Actress is an award given by the San Francisco Bay Area Film Critics Circle to honor an actress who has delivered an outstanding performance in a leading role.

Winners

2000s

2010s

2020s

San Francisco Film Critics Circle Awards
Film awards for lead actress